The 1928 United States presidential election in Wisconsin was held on November 6, 1928 as part of the 1928 United States presidential election. State voters chose 13 electors to the Electoral College, who voted for president and vice president.

Background
Wisconsin had since the decline of the Populist movement been substantially a one-party state dominated by the Republican Party. The Democratic Party became entirely uncompetitive outside certain German Catholic counties adjoining Lake Michigan as the upper classes, along with the majority of workers who followed them, completely fled from William Jennings Bryan's agrarian and free silver sympathies. As Democratic strength weakened severely after 1894 – although the state did develop a strong Socialist Party to provide opposition to the GOP – Wisconsin developed the direct Republican primary in 1903 and this ultimately created competition between the "League" under Robert M. La Follette, and the conservative "Regular" faction.

The beginning of the 1910s would see a minor Democratic revival as many La Follette progressives endorsed Woodrow Wilson, but this flirtation would not be long-lasting as Wilson's "Anglophile" foreign policies were severely opposed by Wisconsin's largely German- and Scandinavian-American populace. Subsequent federal elections saw the Midwest desert the Democratic Party even more completely due to supposed preferential treatment of Southern farmers, and in 1920 Wisconsin's status as a one-party Republican state was solidified as James M. Cox won less than a sixth of the state's presidential vote and Democrats claimed only four state legislative seats, all but one of which would be lost in 1922. Conservative Southern Democrat John W. Davis would do even worse, winning less than one-twelfth of Wisconsin's 1924 presidential vote, and there would never be more than two Democrats in the state legislature between 1922 and 1928.

Nonetheless, in that 1924 election Wisconsin's popular long-time Republican Senator La Follette would via prevalent isolationist and progressive sentiment carry the state's electoral votes, and when La Follette died the following year his family did not endorse a Republican, but rather New York City Catholic Democrat Al Smith. The nomination of Smith – inevitable with other Democrats sitting the election out – had the effect of aligning the Democrats towards Wisconsin's sizeable Southern and Eastern European immigrant population, and Smith's Wall Street connections helped reconnect the isolationist, conservative German Catholic areas of eastern Wisconsin who had completely deserted the Democrats over opposition to Wilson's foreign policies.

Vote
When Senator John J. Blaine endorsed Smith in late September, it became clear that La Follette's endorsement of him had been shared by other prominent Progressives, despite his son urging that sides not be taken. Polls in October, after both candidates had campaigned in the state, viewed Wisconsin as close but leaning toward Smith. However, when the polls closed, it became clear Hoover was showing greater strength than expected even in the pro-Catholic eastern region, and when returns from Milwaukee came in later Smith did not receive the projected two-to-one majority.

Hoover thus carried Wisconsin by a conformable 9.24 percentage point margin, a remarkable transformation from 1920 when the state had been Cox's weakest and Harding won by over 55 percentage points. Smith recouped the Third Party System Democratic counties: in entirely Catholic Marshfield Township which typically gave pre-1916 Democrats over ninety percent but gave Cox only 4 percent, Smith won all but two percent. Hoover's ability to take the La Follette vote in anti-Catholic Scandinavian areas of western Wisconsin was critical in winning him the state.

, this is the last election in which Douglas County voted for a Republican presidential candidate.

Results

Results by county

See also
 United States presidential elections in Wisconsin

References

Wisconsin
1928
1928 Wisconsin elections